Long Prairie may refer to a location in the United States:

Long Prairie, Minnesota
Long Prairie River
Long Prairie Township, Todd County, Minnesota
Long Prairie Township, Mississippi County, Missouri